Orelle is a commune in the Savoie department in the Auvergne-Rhône-Alpes region in south-eastern France.

It is connected by the longest télécabine in the world to Plan Bouchet, a skiing area that is part of the 3 vallées, the largest linked ski domain in the world. From there one can access the Val Thorens ski station.

See also
Communes of the Savoie department

References

External links

 Official site of Orelle Tourism Office
 Official site of Les 3 Vallees ski domain
 Orelle overview
 Orelle skiing on mobile and wap
 Les 3 Vallees mobile and wap
 Vanoise National Park

Ski areas and resorts in France
Communes of Savoie